Koduku: The Rising Sun is a 2004 Indian Telugu-language action drama film directed by M. S. Narayana. The film stars his son, Vikram (in his film debut), Aditi Agarwal and Mounika.

Plot 

Vikram's father, Parandhamayya, is banished from a village from ten years after losing a wrestling match. How Vikram seeks revenge forms the rest of the story.

Cast 

Vikram as Vikram
Aditi Agarwal
Mounika
Suman as Parandhamayya
Ponnambalam as Yalamanda
Rajan P. Dev as Basava Punnayya
Prakash Raj as a NRI
Ahuti Prasad
Tanikella Bharani
Venu Madhav
L. B. Sriram
Brahmanandam
M. S. Narayana
Sunil
Sudha
Raghu Babu
Aarthi Agarwal (special appearance)

Production 
The film is produced by Tadi Tata Rao, who produced Joruga Husharuga (2002).

Reception 
A critic from Sify  opined that "Comedian M.S.Narayana has launched his son Vikram in this film that has nothing new, supported by an inane story and screenplay". Jeevi of Idlebrain.com rated the film one out of five and wrote that "By launching his own son as hero, MS Narayana did more harm to Vikram than any help". A critic from Indiaglitz stated that "The entire cast comes out as if they are auditioning for a stage drama in the 60s and 70s --- loud, predictable and overplaying".

Box office 
The film was a box office failure. M. S. Narayana cited that the reason for the film's failure was that the audience expected him to make a comedy film. After the film's failure, M. S. Narayana went on to direct a comedy film Bhajantrilu (2007) also starring his son Vikram.

References

External links 
 

2000s Telugu-language films
2004 action drama films
Indian action drama films